is a Japanese voice actor and actor.

Life and career 
Terada was born in Tokyo, as first son of Masaaki Terada, a famous painter. In 1961, Terada begun to be an actor.

Terada is known as a villain, such as Alien Metron in Ultraman Max, and Colonel Muska in Castle in the Sky. Also, Terada's narration has a good reputation, so he worked as narrator in a lot of TV dramas, documents, and movies.

Terada loves reading.

Filmography

Film

Television

Original video animation (OVA)
Wild 7 (1994) - Masaru Kusanami

Dubbing
Blade Runner (1986 TBS edition) – Roy Batty (Rutger Hauer)
Cat People (1985 Fuji TV edition) – Paul Gallier (Malcolm McDowell)
Centennial – Jacques Pasquinel (Stephen McHattie)
Gandhi (1987 Fuji TV edition) – Mahatma Gandhi (Ben Kingsley)
Shōgun – Father Martin Alvito (Damien Thomas)
Wanted Dead or Alive – Josh Randall (Steve McQueen)

Narration 

 Homura Tatsu (1993 NHK Taiga drama)

Awards and prizes

References

External links
Official Site 

1942 births
Living people
Male voice actors from Tokyo
20th-century Japanese male actors
21st-century Japanese male actors
Male actors from Tokyo